Phalacra kagiensis is a moth in the family Drepanidae. It was described by Wileman in 1916. It is found in Taiwan.

References

Moths described in 1916
Drepaninae